Bruna Patricia Maria Teresa Romilda Lombardi (born August 1, 1952) is a Brazilian poet, writer, model, and film and TV actress. She is daughter of Italian film producer Ugo Lombardi.

She is married to actor Carlos Alberto Riccelli and has a son (Kim Lombardi Riccelli). They reside in Los Angeles, California, United States. She is still thought of as one of the great Brazilian beauties.

Filmography
2007 – The Sign of the City as Teca
2006 – Brasília 18% as Laura
2005 – Stress, Orgasmos e Salvação
2002 – O Príncipe as Maria Cristina
1983 – O Cangaceiro Trapalhão as Fada
1978 – A Noite dos Duros

Television appearances
The Secret Life of Couples – Sofia Prado
O quinto dos infernos – Branca Camargo
Andando nas nuvens – Frida
O fim do mundo – Gardênia
De corpo e alma – Bettina Lopes Jordão
Roda de fogo – Lúcia Brandão
Memórias de um gigolô – Lu
Grande sertão: veredas – Diadorim
Louco amor – Patrícia Dumont
Avenida Paulista – Anamaria
Um homem muito especial – Mariana
Aritana – Doutora Estela
Sem lenço, sem documento – Carla

Publications
No Ritmo dessa Festa, 1976
Poesia Gaia, 1980
O Perigo do Dragão, 1984
Diário do Grande Sertão, 1986
Apenas bons amigos, 1987
Filmes Proibidos, 1990

External links
 . Bruna Lombardi's Poetry
 

1952 births
Living people
Actresses from São Paulo
Brazilian people of Italian descent
20th-century Brazilian poets
20th-century Brazilian women writers
Brazilian women poets